The 2014 New Zealand Radio Awards were the awards for excellence in the New Zealand radio industry during 2013. It was the 37th New Zealand Radio Awards, recognising staff, volunteers and contractors in both commercial and non-commercial broadcasting.

Winners and nominees

This is a list of nominees, with winners in bold.

Air Personality of the Year

Best Community Access Programmes

Best New Broadcaster

Best News

Best NZ Produced Musical Programme

Best Promotion

References

New Zealand Radio Awards